Holly Beth Flanders (born December 26, 1957) is a former World Cup alpine ski racer from the United States.

Racing career
Born in Arlington, Massachusetts, and raised in Candia NH, Flanders specialized in downhill  and finished second in the World Cup downhill season standings in 1982. She gained her first World Cup victory that season in Bad Gastein, Austria, and followed it up with another podium the next day. Flanders represented the U.S. in the Winter Olympics in 1980 and 1984, and in the World Championships in 1982 and 1985. During her career, she tallied three World Cup wins, six podiums, and 27 top ten finishes.

After racing
Flanders retired from international competition following the 1986 season and became director of skiing at the Park City ski resort in Utah. Her son, Alex Schlopy, is a freestyle skier.

World Cup results

Race podiums
 3 wins - (3 DH) 
 6 podiums - (6 DH)

Season standings

World Championship results 

From 1948 through 1980, the Winter Olympics were also the World Championships for alpine skiing.

Olympic results

References

External links
 
 Holly Flanders World Cup standings at the International Ski Federation
 
 
 The Canyons – Holly Flanders' women's skiing workshops
 hollyflanders.com – personal site

1957 births
Living people
American female alpine skiers
Olympic alpine skiers of the United States
Alpine skiers at the 1980 Winter Olympics
Alpine skiers at the 1984 Winter Olympics
21st-century American women